Ronald O. Rieder is an American psychiatrist who served as Vice Chair for Education and Director of the Residency Training Program in the Department of Psychiatry at the Mount Sinai School of Medicine in New York City. Dr. His interests have been in the areas of schizophrenia,  genetics and psychiatric education.  Prior to joining Mount Sinai's faculty as a tenured professor in 2007, he served for several decades as the residency training director at Columbia University's College of Physicians & Surgeons.  He was President of the American Association of Directors of Psychiatric Residency Training in 1992-1993 and in 2007 received the Vestermark Award from the American Psychiatric Association, that organization's highest award for psychiatric education.  He is also the author of approximately sixty original papers in the fields of psychiatry and psychiatric education.

Rieder graduated from Harvard College with a BA in 1964 and received his MD from the Harvard Medical School in 1968.  He completed an internship at Johns Hopkins Hospital and residencies at Albert Einstein's Jacobi Hospital (1969–1971) and the National Institute of Mental Health (1971–1973).

He initiated a new pathway to combining PhD degree research with MD medical training, via combining Psychiatry Residency with PhD study at Mount Sinai, supported by the National Institute of Mental Health.

References

American psychiatrists
Harvard College alumni
Living people
Harvard Medical School alumni
Year of birth missing (living people)